The 1927–28 Boston Bruins season was the team's fourth in the NHL. The Bruins finished first in the American Division, marking its first division title in franchise history and its second playoff appearance.  The team lost in the playoffs to the eventual Stanley Cup champion New York Rangers.

Offseason

The league adopted a goal net designed by Bruins general manager Art Ross; the so-called "Ross goal" would be the standard net into the 1980s.

Prominent newcomers included Dutch Gainor and Dit Clapper, both of whose rights were purchased from the minor leagues, and who would make a significant impact with the Bruins down the years.  The Bruins also obtained Fred Gordon in the offseason, acquiring him from the Detroit Cougars for Harry Meeking, while Red Stuart was traded to Boston's Minneapolis minor league team, for the rights to Gainor and Nobby Clark.

Regular season

For the second straight season, Harry Oliver led the Bruins in scoring, and although the team's attack was relatively anemic – the Bruins finished with 77 goals, leading only the last-place teams in both divisions, the Chicago Black Hawks and the New York Americans – they cut down sharply in goals allowed, leading the division behind Hal Winkler's goaltending.  Eddie Shore was the team's great star, finishing just one point behind Oliver in scoring and leading the league in penalty minutes by a wide margin.

Winkler in his own turn had fifteen shutouts, tied with Alex Connell for the league lead and a new NHL record; Winkler's mark remains the Bruins' single-season record for shutouts, over ninety years later, and is still tied for the second-most shutouts recorded in a single season.  Although veteran Sprague Cleghorn was fading and missed a quarter of the season with injuries, Shore and defense partner Lionel Hitchman were ironmen, playing most of each game.

With Boston's first place finish, the Bruins became the first team to win the Prince of Wales Trophy, awarded for the first time in this season.

Final standings

Record vs. opponents

Schedule and results

Playoffs 

The Bruins gained a first-round bye by virtue of winning the division, and played the New York Rangers in the second round in a two-game, total goal series.  Their scoring problems of the regular season continued, exacerbated by a flu bug going through the dressing room and various minor injuries; Shore, Clapper, Gainor and Connor were particularly affected.

Boston tied the first game 1–1 in New York, the Rangers' final home game of the playoffs – this was the first of perennial disruptions to the Rangers' playoff schedule due to Madison Square Garden hosting the circus in the spring.  The Bruins lost the second match in Boston 4–1, on three Ranger third-period goals as the weakened Brown-and-Gold folded at last, to drop the total-goal series five goals to two.  Harry Oliver, who scored a goal in each game, was the sole offensive threat.

Player statistics

Regular season
Scoring

Goaltending

Playoffs
Scoring

Goaltending

Transactions
 Acquired Dutch Gainor from Minneapolis of the American Hockey Association for Red Stuart, cash and future considerations, October 24, 1927.
 Purchased Dit Clapper from Boston of the Canadian-American League, October 25, 1927.
 Sold the rights to Duke Keats to Chicago, Carson Cooper to Detroit and Billy Boucher to the Americans.
 Traded Jimmy Herbert to Toronto for the rights to Eric Pettinger and $15,000, December 21, 1927.

See also
1927–28 NHL season

References

Boston Bruins seasons
Boston
Boston
Boston Bruins
Boston Bruins
1920s in Boston